Mirror Image is the third album from singer Joey Pearson.

Track listing
"Mirror Image" – 2:37
"Let's Stay Together" (Al Green, Willie Mitchell, Al Jackson Jr.) – 3:19
"Stand by Me" (Ben E. King, Jerry Leiber and Mike Stoller) – 2:45
"Livin' for the City" (Stevie Wonder) – 3:23
"Friends" (Elton John, Bernie Taupin) – 2:27
"You've Got a Friend" (Carole King) – 4:23

References

External links 
 Joey Pearson - Mirror Image (2004) EP credits & releases at AllMusic
 Joey Pearson - Mirror Image (2004) EP album to be listened as stream on Spotify

Joey Pearson albums
2004 EPs